Bent is a hamlet in the Dutch province of South Holland. It is located in the municipality of Alphen aan den Rijn, about 2 km northwest of the village Hazerswoude-Dorp.

The hamlet is surrounded by three nurseries.

References

Populated places in South Holland
Alphen aan den Rijn